Frank B. Mallory (–2017) was a professor of organic chemistry at Bryn Mawr College. He was on faculty at Bryn Mawr for 54 years, the longest-serving faculty member in the school's history. His work focused on photochemistry, NMR spectroscopy, and solid-state chemistry. The Mallory reaction is an organic name reaction he discovered while a graduate student. Mallory's professional honors include a John Simon Guggenheim Memorial Foundation fellowship and a Sloan Research Fellowship.

References 

Bryn Mawr College faculty
Organic chemists
Photochemists
1930s births
2017 deaths

Year of birth uncertain